Evan F. Kohlmann (born 1979) is an American terrorism consultant who has worked for the FBI and other governmental organizations.

He is a contributor to the Counterterrorism Blog, a senior investigator with The Nine Eleven Finding Answers Foundation, and a terrorism analyst for NBC News.

In his manifesto Anders Behring Breivik copied 25 pages verbatim from an ideological text by Evan Kohlmann and published by an institute led by Magnus Ranstorp.

Early life and education
In the profile for the Penn Law Journal, Kohlmann said he spent summers in France while growing up, because his father studied there.  Kohlmann graduated from Pine Crest School in Fort Lauderdale, Florida.

He attended the Georgetown University Edmund A. Walsh School of Foreign Service, where he studied under Mamoun Fandy.  Fandy's mentorship sparked his interest in Middle East politics.  "When [Fandy] lived in Egypt, he passed by the number two guy in al-Qaeda there every day. He really knew his subject."

Kohlmann entered the University of Pennsylvania Law School in the fall of 2001, a few weeks before al-Qaeda's attacks on the U.S. on September 11, 2001.

Counter-terrorism career
Kohlmann worked as an intern at The Investigative Project, a Washington, DC, counter-terrorism think-tank.

He wrote Al- Qaida’s Jihad in Europe: The Afghan-Bosnian Network.

He is a Senior Terrorism Consultant for The NEFA Foundation.  He is also a contributor to the Counterterrorism Blog, and a terrorism analyst for NBC News.

He has called Anwar al-Awlaki "one of the principal jihadi luminaries for would-be homegrown terrorists. His fluency with English, his unabashed advocacy of jihad and mujahideen organizations, and his Web-savvy approach are a powerful combination." He calls al-Awlaki's lecture "Constants on the Path of Jihad", which he says was based on a similar document written by al-Qaeda in Saudi Arabia's founder, the "virtual bible for lone-wolf Muslim extremists."

He produced The Al Qaida Plan, a 90-minute movie, to serve as evidence and stress relief during the Guantanamo Military Commissions,  
which was sponsored by the Office of Military Commissions. According to Carol Rosenberg of the Miami Herald:  "He modeled the video after The Nazi Plan, an instructional movie shown at the late 1940s Nuremberg tribunals for the most senior Nazi leadership."

Initially Captain Keith Allred, the President of Salim Ahmed Hamdan's Military Commission ruled that the film would be prejudicial, but he reversed this decision.

Expert witness
Kohlmann has served frequently as an expert witness for the prosecution in terrorism trials.  "There haven’t been that many cases yet, so sometimes the prosecutors are doing their first ones. I know how the courts work, so I am pretty valuable right now.” Despite being considered a terrorism expert, Kohlmann cannot read, write or speak Arabic.

His expertise and neutrality have been disputed by defense attorneys and other experts, while his book ″Al-Qaida’s Jihad in Europe: The Afghan-Bosnian Network″ was declined by University of Pennsylvania Press.

He testified as an expert witness in the following cases:

Publications

See also
Jarret Brachman
Steven Emerson
Rita Katz

References

External links
Globalterroralert.com Website run by Kohlmann

1979 births
American male bloggers
American bloggers
American male writers
Counterterrorism theorists
Walsh School of Foreign Service alumni
Intelligence analysts
Living people
Terrorism theorists
University of Pennsylvania Law School alumni